Jordi Bonastre Company (born 7 August 2000) is a Spanish field hockey player who plays as a midfielder for División de Honor club Atlètic Terrassa and the Spain national team.

Club career
In the Spanish División de Honor, Bonastre plays for Atlètic Terrassa.

International career

Under–21
Bonastre made his debut for the Spain under-21 team in 2019 during an eight–nations tournament in Madrid. He went on to represent the team later that year at the EuroHockey Junior Championship in Valencia where the team finished 4th.

In 2021 he captained the team at the FIH Junior World Cup in Bhubaneswar.

Los Redsticks
In 2022 Jordi Bonastre made his debut for Los Redsticks in a test match against the Netherlands in Cádiz. He was later named in the national squad for season three of the FIH Pro League. He made his World Cup debut at the 2023 Men's FIH Hockey World Cup.

Honours
Atlètic Terrassa
 Divisón de Honor: 2021–22
 Copa del Rey: 2021–22

References

External links
 
 

2000 births
Living people
Male field hockey midfielders
Spanish male field hockey players
2023 Men's FIH Hockey World Cup players
Atlètic Terrassa players
División de Honor de Hockey Hierba players
Place of birth missing (living people)